This name uses Portuguese naming customs. The first or maternal family name is Matos and the second or paternal family name is Dos Santos.

Sténio Nivaldo Matos dos Santos (born 6 May 1988), commonly known as Sténio, is a Cape Verde international footballer who plays as a midfielder for Sacavenense.

Career
Born in Mindelo, Sténio started his career at hometown club Académica do Mindelo. In 2009, he joined the other club in the town CS Mindelense.

On 1 July 2014, Sténio joined Cherno More Varna in Bulgaria on a two-year contract. On 30 May 2015, Sténio was sent off with a second yellow card after 38 minutes in the 2015 Bulgarian Cup Final against Levski Sofia, but his team managed to prevail after extra time despite its numerical disadvantage. 

In July 2016, he signed a one-year contract with Botev Plovdiv.  He was released in December.

Sténio left FK Ventspils after one year, at the end of 2018.

International career
Sténio received his first call-up to the Cape Verde squad in May 2012, for the 2014 FIFA World Cup qualifier against Sierra Leone on 2 June. He made his debut in the match, playing from the start in central midfield.

In January 2013, Sténio was named in Cape Verde's squad for the 2013 Africa Cup of Nations, but did not feature in any of the four games Cape Verde played.

Career statistics

Club

Honours

Club
Cherno More
 Bulgarian Cup: 2014–15
 Bulgarian Supercup: 2015

References

External links
 
 
 

1988 births
Living people
Cape Verdean footballers
Cape Verde international footballers
Académica do Mindelo players
CS Mindelense players
C.D. Feirense players
PFC Cherno More Varna players
Botev Plovdiv players
FC Politehnica Iași (2010) players
FC Dacia Chișinău players
FK Ventspils players
Primeira Liga players
First Professional Football League (Bulgaria) players
Liga I players
Moldovan Super Liga players
Latvian Higher League players
2013 Africa Cup of Nations players
Association football midfielders
Cape Verdean expatriate footballers
Expatriate footballers in Portugal
Cape Verdean expatriate sportspeople in Portugal
Expatriate footballers in Bulgaria
Cape Verdean expatriate sportspeople in Bulgaria
Expatriate footballers in Romania
Cape Verdean expatriate sportspeople in Romania
Expatriate footballers in Moldova
Cape Verdean expatriate sportspeople in Moldova
Expatriate footballers in Latvia
People from Mindelo